Donald Carl Swayze (born August 10, 1958) is an American character actor, noted for acting in dramatic series and soap operas as well as several feature films, and theatrical work.

Early life
Swayze was born in Houston, Texas, the middle child of Patsy Swayze (née Karnes; 1927–2013), a dance teacher; and Jesse Wayne Swayze (1925–1982), an engineering draftsman. Patsy owned a dance studio where neighborhood students took dance lessons. Patrick and Donald Swayze both attended and graduated from Frank Black Junior High School and then Waltrip High School in northwest Houston. Donald had an older sister, Vickie Lynn (1949–1994), an older brother, Patrick (1952–2009), one younger brother, Sean Kyle (born 1962), and one younger adopted sister Bora Song "Bambi".

Film career
Swayze's film work has included an appearance as a dancer in the 1980 film Urban Cowboy, as Ruben in the film Father for Charlie, and as Mark in the film Shy People, along with a role alongside Corey Feldman in a movie called Edge of Honor where he played the part of a "Homicidal Lumberjack". He also played Col. Sherman Rutherford in a western–noir hybrid titled Heathens and Thieves in 2012.  He also starred in the film Death Ring, and as the Alamo courier James Bonham in Alamo: The Price of Freedom, an IMAX film shown in San Antonio, Texas.

Television career
Swayze performed the role of James (Jim) Mackey in the seventh episode of season five on the Netflix series Longmire. He appeared in two soap operas: The Young and the Restless and Days of Our Lives. In 2010, Swayze guest-starred in six episodes in a recurring role as Gus, a werewolf, on the HBO series True Blood. His television drama work includes multiple appearances in Murder She Wrote, The X Files, NYPD Blue, NCIS, Carnivàle, and dozens of other programs. Swayze had a role as an intellectually disabled man suspected of murder in an episode of the television drama Matlock. In 1989 he portrayed a member of a gang that held hostages in the hotel in the Western drama Paradise. He played Jesse James in a season-two episode of Lois & Clark: The New Adventures of Superman. He played the demon Lucius in an episode of Charmed in 2005. He had a recurring role on Criminal Minds, specifically the episodes "The Big Game" and "Revelations", in which he played Charles Hankel, the father and alternate personality of serial killer Tobias Hankel. On Cold Case, Swayze played the adult Grant Hall. Swayze had a small guest appearance on It's Always Sunny in Philadelphia as a crazy boat captain. He has also appeared on Beyond Belief: Fact or Fiction, and The Bridge. Swayze also appeared in an episode of Sons of Anarchy. In 2017, he joined the cast of General Hospital for a stint in the role of Buzz. Additional roles include a non-speaking role as rapist William Dollar on LA Law. In 2019, Swayze appeared in the season premiere of American Horror Story: 1984, the ninth installment of the FX horror anthology television series American Horror Story, and played Dennis Seacrest, a murderous henchman working for George Hearst, in Deadwood: The Movie that same year.

Stage career

In 2001, Swayze was on stage as Pedro in Man of La Mancha at the Simi Valley Cultural Arts Center. In 2005, he played Roy in the comedy Lone Star at the Beverly Hills Playhouse. In the fall of 2011, he co-starred with Anne Archer in an original stage play titled Jane Fonda: In the Court of Public Opinion at the Edgemar Theater in Santa Monica, California; he played U.S. Army Sgt. Don Simpson (retired), a wounded veteran of the Vietnam War.

Personal life
Don Swayze is an avid cyclist and skydiver, and races cross country mountain bikes in his spare time. Don is married to Charlene Swayze. Don along with his wife Charlene have established an animal therapy ranch in Los Angeles County, California known as Swayze Ranch. Charlene has also established the Swayze Foundation.

Film

Television

References

External links

The Swayze Foundation

Living people
20th-century American male actors
21st-century American male actors
Male actors from Texas
American male film actors
American male television actors
People from Houston
1958 births